The Strength and Agility of Insects is a 1911 British short  silent documentary film, directed by F. Percy Smith, featuring close-ups of houseflies and other insects secured and juggling various objects with their feet. The films in this series, which included The Acrobatic Fly (1910), "caused an absolute furore when they were first shown to the public," and, according to Jenny Hammerton of the BFI, Smith, whose stated intention "was of course to entertain the public, but also to demonstrate the strength and agility of those insects we might unthinkingly squash or swat when they settle on our lunch," "was forced to justify his methods in the press, guaranteeing that there was no trickery involved and certainly no cruelty."

References

External links

British black-and-white films
British silent short films
1911 documentary films
Black-and-white documentary films
Films about insects
British short documentary films
1910s short documentary films
1910s British films
Silent documentary films